Euploea westwoodii, or Westwood's king crow, is a butterfly in the family Nymphalidae. It was described by Cajetan Felder and Rudolf Felder in 1865. It is found in the Celebes in the Australasian realm.

Subspecies
E. w. westwoodii (South Sulawesi)
E. w. viola Butler, 1866 (Sulawesi)
E. w. meyeri Hopffer, 1874 (Sulawesi)
E. w. labreyi (Moore, 1883) (Sula Islands)
E. w. bangkaiensis (Fruhstorfer, 1899) (Banggai Islands)
E. w. leochares Fruhstorfer, 1910 Salajar (Salajar)

Etymology
The species is named for John Obadiah Westwood.

References

External links
Euploea at Markku Savela's Lepidoptera and Some Other Life Forms

Euploea
Butterflies described in 1865
Butterflies of Indonesia
Taxa named by Baron Cajetan von Felder
Taxa named by Rudolf Felder